Asia Muhammad was the defending champion, but lost to Varatchaya Wongteanchai in the first round.

Risa Ozaki won the title, defeating Georgia Brescia in the final, 6–4, 6–4.

Seeds

Main draw

Finals

Top half

Bottom half

References 
 Main draw

Canberra Tennis International - Singles
2016 in Australian tennis
2016